The 2008 Osaka gubernatorial election were held in Osaka Prefecture on January 27, 2008 to elect the next governor of Osaka. Toru Hashimoto was elected as new governor.

Results

Sources 
 Results from JanJan 

2008 elections in Japan
Osaka gubernatorial elections
January 2008 events in Japan